Ground out may refer to:
Ground out (baseball), a method of putting out a batter
A US colloquialism for an electrical short circuit to earth